Choam Khsant District is a district located in Preah Vihear Province, in northern Cambodia. The district capital is at Cheom Ksan town, near the Thai border. Cambodia's famous Preah Vihear Temple is located in this district of the Preah Vihear province. According to the 1998 census of Cambodia, it had a population of 16,073.

Administration 
The following table shows the villages of Banteay Ampil district by commune.

References

Districts of Preah Vihear province